Gemma Sernissi (born 6 March 2000) is an Italian professional racing cyclist, who currently rides for UCI Women's Continental Team .

References

External links

2000 births
Living people
Italian female cyclists
Place of birth missing (living people)